Two referendums were held in Switzerland during 1942. The first was held on 25 January on a popular initiative that would provide for the direct election of the Federal Council, as well as increasing the number of members. It was rejected by voters. The second was held on 3 May on a popular initiative "for the reorganisation of the National Council", and was also rejected.

Background
The referendums were both popular initiatives, which required a double majority; a majority of the popular vote and majority of the cantons. The decision of each canton was based on the vote in that canton. Full cantons counted as one vote, whilst half cantons counted as half.

Results

January referendum

May referendum

References

1942 referendums
1942 in Switzerland
Referendums in Switzerland